Double Vision is the fourth studio album by American singer Prince Royce; it was released on July 24, 2015, by RCA Records. It is Royce's first album to be recorded primarily in English.

Way ahead of the album's release, on November 24, 2014, Royce released "Stuck on a Feeling" (featuring Snoop Dogg) as the first single from the album. The single is Royce's best-charting single in the United States to date, having reached number forty-three on the Billboard Hot 100 singles chart.

The album was also preceded by its second single, "Back It Up" (featuring Jennifer Lopez and Pitbull), which was released in May 2015. The single reached number ten on the US Latin Pop Songs chart, number nineteen on the US Hot Latin Songs chart, and number ninety-two on the Billboard Hot 100. The Spanish-language version of the song was nominated for the Latin Grammy Award for Best Urban Song at the 2015 ceremony, making Royce an eight-time Latin Grammy-nominated performer.

Background
While speaking about recording an English only album, Royce said; "It's not impossible, but I think it's unfair sometimes when you see an album that has five songs in English, five songs in Spanish. I think that I prefer to do separate albums for each. Definitely my intention is never to leave Latin music; I have a core audience there. But this English album is something brand new, like getting a new toy for Christmas. I'm getting the same feeling I got when I released my very first album, so I'm kinda just looking forward to having fun and doing both from here on out."

Reception
Dennis Leopold from Rolling Stone gave the album 2.5 out of 5, saying "On his English-language debut, Latin superstar Prince Royce aims to prove himself the crossover heir to Ricky Martin and Enrique Iglesias... but Double Vision lacks focus, failing to establish a clear identity for Royce: He morphs from a version of Jason Derulo to Drake to Bruno Mars." adding "His voice is malleable enough, but he stands out most when he goes back to his roots. "There for You" floats along a tropical, guitar-laced groove, and "Lucky One" is all bachata sweetness, guaranteed to make the girls swoon."

Chuck Campbell of Knox News gave the album 3.5 out of 5, saying; "While Double Vision isn't a bold statement, it seamlessly eases Royce into the wider English-language pop market, a crisply produced modern album with dance songs, ballads and moderate amounts of Latin flavor. His voice is fairly distinctive with a wide enough range to help him navigate acoustic-rooted, swoon-worthy ballads like “Lucky One” and “Extraordinary,” soulful enough for the R&B-inflected cuts such as the sensual “Stuck on a Feeling” and glossy “Dangerous” and exotic enough to straddle the woozy electronic swagger of “Handcuffs” and tropical bluster of “Seal It With a Kiss.”

Track listing 

Notes
 signifies an additional producer.
 signifies a vocal producer.
 signifies an additional vocal producer.
 signifies an executive producer.
 signifies a co-producer.

Charts

Release history

References

2015 albums
Prince Royce albums
RCA Records albums
Albums produced by Ilya Salmanzadeh